Greatest Hits Live! (also known as Finest Selection Tour) was the fourth headlining concert tour by English-Irish girl group The Saturdays. It was their first tour in three years, launched in support of their greatest hits album, Finest Selection: The Greatest Hits.

Background

Just a few months after releasing their fourth studio album Living for the Weekend (2013), the group announced they would release a Greatest Hits album and tour in support for the album. The tour was the group's first in three years. The tour played a mixture of theatres and arenas with most dates sold out at full capacity. The largest attendance for a single show was Wembley Arena, London with almost 10,000 in attendance. During the Glasgow show, Frankie Bridge had a pre-recorded segment to show she was competing on the twelfth season of Strictly Come Dancing that would start airing three days after the tour completed.

Setlist
The following set list is representative of the show on 7 September 2014. It is not representative of all concerts for the duration of the tour.

"What Are You Waiting For?"
"Up"
"808"  
"Work"
"Forever Is Over"
"Higher"
"Gentleman"
"Just Can't Get Enough"
"My Heart Takes Over"
"Disco Love" (with incorporation of "Stayin' Alive" and "...Baby One More Time")
"30 Days" / "Wildfire" / "Get Ready, Get Set" / "One Shot" / "Don't Let Me Dance Alone" / "Missing You"
"Not Giving Up"
"If This Is Love"
"Notorious"
"Walking Through The Desert"
"Ego"
"Chasing Lights"
"Issues"
"All Fired Up"
"What About Us"

Tour dates

Box office score data

References

2014 concert tours
The Saturdays concert tours